Manolich is a village in Sungurlare Municipality, in Burgas Province, in southeastern Bulgaria. As of 2011, the village of Manolich has 1211 inhabitants, most of whom are  Turkish while a few are Pomaks. The main religion is Islam.

References

Villages in Burgas Province